Daria Danilova (born 8 September 2002) is a Russian-born pair skater who competes for the Netherlands. With her skating partner, Michel Tsiba, she is the 2020 Dutch national champion and the 2020 NRW Trophy bronze medalist. They competed in the final segment at the 2020 European Championships and are the first Dutch pair to qualify for the World Championships.

Personal life 
Danilova was born on 8 September 2002 in Moscow. She is learning Dutch. Danilova received her Dutch residence permit  2020. She has a pet dog.

Career

Early career 
Danilova started skating at age three in 2006. She competed in ladies' singles in her native Russia, but never qualified to the Russian Championships. In 2017, Danilova briefly competed pairs with Dmitry Shulgin under coaches Pavel Kitashev, Arina Ushakova, and Nina Mozer. They split after six months and she skated alone for a year.

Danilova teamed up with Dutch skater Michel Tsiba for the Netherlands in May 2018. Earlier in the season, he had met one of her coaches at a seminar in Berlin and they arranged a tryout. At the start of their partnership, Danilova/Tsiba alternated training in Berlin and Moscow every three months due to the differences in their respective citizenships' visa requirements. The pair fund over half of their training costs out of pocket via Tsiba's student finances.

2018–2019 season 
Danilova/Tsiba won their debut international competition, the 2018 Golden Spin of Zagreb on the junior level. They then placed tenth at the 2019 Bavarian Open. In February, Danilova/Tsiba won the 2019 Dutch junior national title unopposed. However, they missed achieving the minimum TES requirements for the 2019 World Junior Championships.

2019–2020 season 
Danilova/Tsiba competed at three Challenger Series events to open the season, finishing tenth at 2019 CS Finlandia Trophy, 17th at 2019 CS Warsaw Cup, and 15th at 2019 CS Golden Spin of Zagreb.

At the 2020 European Championships in January, Danilova/Tsiba became the first Dutch pair in 24 years to compete in a European Championships since Jeltje Schulten / Alcuin Schulten last represented the country at the event in 1996. They qualified to the final segment and finished 16th overall. In February, they finished eighth at the Bavarian Open and tenth at the Challenge Cup; the latter event doubled as the Dutch Championships where, as the only Dutch pair, Danilova/Tsiba won their first senior national title.

At the Challenge Cup, Danilova/Tsiba earned the necessary TES minimums for the 2020 World Championships. They are the first Dutch pair in history to qualify for the World Championships. The event was eventually cancelled due to the COVID-19 pandemic.

2020–2021 season 
During the offseason, Tsiba underwent surgery to repair a torn meniscus. However, the pair did not start training together again until the end of August due to issues with Danilova's Dutch visa. Danilova/Tsiba made their season debut at the 2020 NRW Autumn Trophy in November and won their first senior international medal, bronze behind Germans Annika Hocke / Robert Kunkel and Minerva Fabienne Hase / Nolan Seegert. Making their debut at the World Championships in Stockholm, they placed twenty-second.

2021–2022 season 
Beginning the season at the 2021 Lombardia Trophy, Danilova/Tsiba placed eighth. They competed at the 2021 CS Nebelhorn Trophy, placing ninth and failing to qualify a place at the 2022 Winter Olympics. Their third Challenger event, the 2021 CS Warsaw Cup, Danilova/Tsiba were fifteenth. They finished twenty-first at the 2022 European Championships, missing the free skate. 

Danilova/Tsiba concluded the season at the 2022 World Championships, where they finished a career-best ninth in a field depleted due to Russia being banned as a result of their invasion of Ukraine and the Chinese Skating Association opted not to send athletes to compete in Montpellier.

2022–2023 season 
Danilova/Tsiba decided that the Russian invasion of Ukraine would not affect their training in Russia, opting to spend about half their time in Sochi, Russia, and half in Heerenveen, Netherlands. On training in Russia, they commented: "We don't notice the war here. It's shockingly quiet." They were unable to compete at the 2022 Skate America because Danilova's visa application was declined.

Danilova/Tsiba began their season with a sixth-place finish at the 2022 CS Finlandia Trophy. They finished sixth as well at the 2022 NHK Trophy, their Grand Prix debut, and then fifth at the 2022 Grand Prix of Espoo. Nika Osipova / Dmitry Epstein won the Netherlands' only pair skating berth at the 2023 European Championships.

Programs 
 With Tsiba

Competitive highlights 
CS: Challenger Series

 With Tsiba

References

External links 
 
 Official website

2002 births
Living people
Dutch female pair skaters
Russian female pair skaters
Russian emigrants to the Netherlands